This is a list of reservoirs in the county of Staffordshire in England with a capacity of more than 25,000m³, based on data from the public register of reservoirs. There are 34 reservoirs above this capacity in Staffordshire, these include two water supply reservoirs, seven canal feeder reservoirs and 25 amenity or ornamental lakes. This list does not include flood storage reservoirs, service reservoirs or ash lagoons. 

Reservoirs
Staffordshire